Milan Krajniak (born 30 January 1973) is a Slovak politician. He has served as Minister of Labour, Social Affairs and Family since 21 March 2020.

References 

Living people
1973 births
Place of birth missing (living people)
Government ministers of Slovakia
21st-century Slovak politicians
20th-century Slovak people
Members of the National Council (Slovakia) 2016-2020